Herman Wrangel (born 1584/1587 – 10 December 1643) was a Swedish military officer and statesman of Baltic German extraction.

Biography
Herman von Wrangel was born in Livonia. He came to Sweden around 1608. In 1612, he participated in the Kalmar War against Denmark. In 1619,  Wrangel was commander of Älvsborg fortress. He was appointed Field Marshal in 1621, Privy Councillor in 1630, and Governor General of Swedish Livonia in 1643.

Wrangel was married three times. In 1636, he married Amalie of Nassau-Siegen, daughter of John VII, Count of Nassau-Siegen. He was the father of statesman and military commander Carl Gustaf von Wrangel (1613–1676).

See also
Wrangel family
Polish-Swedish War

References

Other Sources
 Wrangel, 1. Herman, "Nordisk familjebok" (2nd edition, 1921)

External links

1580s births
1643 deaths
Field marshals of Sweden
Governors-General of Sweden
Members of the Privy Council of Sweden
17th-century Swedish nobility
Baltic-German people
17th-century Swedish military personnel
People from Põltsamaa
17th-century Swedish politicians
Herman